Irin (also Romanized as Īrīn; also known as Abrīn and Īrman) is a village in Chichaklu Rural District, in the Ahmadabad-e Mostowfi District of Eslamshahr County, Tehran Province, Iran. At the 2006 census, its population was 1,859, in 457 families.

References 

Populated places in Eslamshahr County